Jacksonboro is an unincorporated community and census-designated place located in southeastern Colleton County, South Carolina, United States, along the west side of the Edisto River. Jacksonboro serves as a primary junction along U.S. Highway 17 between Charleston  to the east and Beaufort  to the southwest. The population of Jacksonboro was 478 as of the 2010 census.

Jacksonboro was founded in the 1730s, and named after John Jackson, the original owner of the town site. The Pon Pon Chapel was listed in the National Register of Historic Places in 1972.

Demographics

References

Unincorporated communities in Colleton County, South Carolina
Unincorporated communities in South Carolina
Census-designated places in Colleton County, South Carolina
Census-designated places in South Carolina